ICSA College Sailor of the Year, also known as Marlow Ropes College Sailor of the Year because of the sponsorship  by Marlow Ropes, is an award annually presented, since 1968, by the United States Naval Academy and the executive committee of the Inter-Collegiate Sailing Association (ICSA) to the “Best Intercollegiate Sailor” within ICSA competition, who receives the Everett Morris Memorial Trophy. The trophy is awarded annually for outstanding performance at the highest level of sailing in the collegiate year. The trophy is named in memory of a distinguished journalist who spent more than 30 years as a yachting writer and editor.

History

References

External links